Kleynod is a Ukrainian watch brand owned by the Kyiv Watch Factory (KHZ). kHz was founded by Alexei Zolotarev in November 1997, and the first Kleynod watch was released in 2002.

Leonid Kadeniuk made his first space flight with a KHZ watch; this was the first Ukrainian flight to the stars during the period of Ukraine's independence (after 1991).

Kleynod watches are made according to the own design and engineering developments of the Kyiv Watch Factory.

History

Establishment 
In October 2002, the company received the first corporate order for its products. The first outlet opened in Kyiv Central Department Store at the end of 2002. And in February 2003 there is a serial start of production. In August 2004, a distributor company, Newton Trading Company, was founded.

Development 

In July 2006, a limited series of watches "Kleinody Nezalezhnosti" was released. In 2007, the factory's production capacity was capable of producing 7,000 watches per month, the actual production volume was 4,000 hours / month. Since 2007, the brand enters foreign markets: France, Syria, UAE, Central Asia. As of October, the total number of watches manufactured under the Kleynod brand exceeded 100,000 units.

In 2016, Kleynod watches were presented at the exhibition of promising goods of Ukraine at the Ukrainian-Canadian Business Forum in Toronto.

Sources 

 Official site of Kyiv Watch Factory.
 Official site of TM Kleynod.

References 

1997 establishments in Ukraine
Ukrainian watch brands